CRTP has several meanings in computer science.

 In the C++ programming language, the curiously recurring template pattern
 , Enhanced Compressed RTP (CRTP) for Links with High Delay, Packet Loss and Reordering
 , Compressing IP/UDP/RTP Headers for Low-Speed Serial Links
 Diapolycopene oxygenase, an enzyme
 Cardiac resynchronization therapy pacemaker